FNSS Savunma Sistemleri A.Ş. is a Turkish defense manufacturer founded in 1988. It is owned 51% by Nurol Holding of Turkey and 49% by British–American firm BAE Systems Inc., and operates facilities located in Gölbaşı, Ankara.

FNSS was founded as a joint venture between FMC Corporation and Nurol Holding as FMC Nurol Savunma Sanayii A.Ş. It is a major supplier of tracked and wheeled armored vehicles and weapon systems for the Turkish Armed Forces and Allied Armed Forces.

Products

Tracked Armored Vehicles 

 ACV-AAPC (advanced armored personnel carrier) — with a one-man turret with a 12.7 mm machine gun and ab7.62 mm machine gun; 13 troops carried.
 ACV-AIFV
 AIFV with FMC EWS (assembled by DAF Special Products) turret with a 25 mm Oerlikon Contraves 25 mm cannon and a coaxial 7.62 mm machine gun
 AIFV with Giat Dragar turret with a 25 mm M811 cannon and a coaxial 7.62 mm machine gun.
 ACV-ATV — Armored Tow Vehicle. Fitted with a Norwegian one-man turret with two BGM-71 TOW missiles in a ready to launch position, and four troops carried.
 ACV-AMV — Armored Mortar Vehicle. Fitted with an 81 mm mortar and a 7.62 mm machine gun.
 120 mm AMV — A private venture, armed with a TDA 120mm recoiling mortar in the rear of the vehicle.
 ACV-IFV Sharpshooter — IFV with FNSS Sharpshooter Turret. This variant is now being exported to Malaysia (ACV-300 Adnan).
 ACV with HMTS — armed with four Hellfire missiles in the ready to fire position.
 ACV-300 — Fitted with a 300 hp powerpack similar to the M113A3, but with high power.
 ACV-350 — Fitted with a 350 hp powerpack.
 ACV-S — A stretched version of the AIFV with an additional road wheel and extra armor giving resistance to 14.5mm AP projectiles, with an upgraded 350 or 400 hp powerpack. Weight is 18,000 kg. A variety of turrets are available, including 12.7mm, 25mm (FNSS Sharpshooter Turret) and 30 mm as well as an Eryx ATGM missile launcher and 120mm mortar turret.
ACV-15
ACV-19
 ACV-30
ACV-AD  Air Defence
 LAWC-T
KAPLAN 10 Anti-tank
KAPLAN 20 NG-AFV New Generation Armored Fighting Vehicle
KAPLAN MT Medium Tank  — Integrated with Cockerill 105mm high-pressure rifled gun
KAPLAN 30 NG-AFV New Generation Armored Fighting Vehicle
MAV Marine Assault Vehicle — Used by Amphibious Marine Brigade (Turkish Armed Forces)

Wheeled Armored Vehicles 

 FNSS Pars
 Pars III 6x6
 Pars III 8x8
 Pars 4x4 STA Anti-tank
 Pars 6x6 Scout
 Pars 6x6 CBRN vehicle

Engineering Vehicles 

 FNSS Samur SYHK wheeled amphibious armoured vehicle-launched bridge
 AZMİM Kunduz  tracked amphibious combat engineering armoured bulldozer

Gun turrets 

 FNSS Sharpshooter Turret
 Teber-30
 Teber-30/35
 UKTK
 Saber-25

Modernization 

 ZMA-15 Infantry fighting vehicle modernization.
 M113 armored personnel carrier modernization.

Similar companies 
 Otokar
 Nurol
 BMC
 Katmerciler

See also
 Armoured car (military)
 Armoured personnel carrier
 Armoured recovery vehicle
 Armoured warfare
 Lists of armoured fighting vehicles
 Non-military armoured vehicles

References

External links
 http://www.fnss.com.tr/ Official website
 FNSS Savunma Sistemleri manufacturer and supplier of armoured vehicles (Army recognition)

Defence companies of Turkey
Companies based in Ankara
Military vehicle manufacturers
Companies established in 1988
Turkish companies established in 1988
Gölbaşı, Ankara
Manufacturing companies established in 1988